The Gambler and the Lady is a 1952 British crime film directed by Patrick Jenkins and Sam Newfield and starring Dane Clark, Kathleen Byron and Naomi Chance. It was made by Hammer Films.

Plot
An American gambler, Forster (Clark), aspires to find acceptance amongst the British nobility after falling in love with the aristocratic Lady Susan Willens (Chance), a prominent blueblood who has actually been pursuing him. To start a relationship with her, he dumps his girlfriend (Byron), a singer in one of his nightclubs who becomes murderously jealous. He must also deal with mobsters who try to take over his nightclubs.  Swindled by an upper-class con-man (Ireland) into voluntarily selling out to the mobsters anyway all his valuable assets including the gambling-casino nightclubs, a racehorse and a boxer, in order to invest in a gold-mining scam that is eventually unmasked as a fraud.

He finds himself broke and in a gunfight with the mobsters, who have been deceived by a gang member with a grudge against him into thinking that they need to kill him.  Wounded in the gunfight, he is about to make an escape from his mobster pursuers when his jilted girlfriend tries to kill him by hitting him with her car. He is knocked down by a glancing blow, and she flees the scene.  At that point, Lady Willens and Forster's butler arrive on the scene and come to his aid.  Forster looks up from the gutter and says, "Susan" with relief and gratitude.  Susan tells the butler, "Let's bring him home."

Cast
 Dane Clark - Jim Forster 
 Kathleen Byron - Pat 
 Naomi Chance - Lady Susan Willens 
 Meredith Edwards - Dave Davies 
 Anthony Forwood - Lord Peter Willens 
 Eric Pohlmann - Arturo Colonna 
 Anthony Ireland - Richard Farning 
 Max Bacon - Maxie 
 Mona Washbourne - Miss Minter 
 Jane Griffiths - Lady Jane Greer 
 Richard Shaw - Louis 
 Julian Somers – Licasi
 George Pastell - Jacko Spina
 Enzo Coticchia - Angelo Colonna 
 Hal Osmond - Stable Groom 
 Percy Marmont - Lord Willens-Hortland
 Felix Felton - Boxing Promoter

References

External links

1952 crime drama films
1952 films
British black-and-white films
British crime drama films
1950s English-language films
Film noir
Films directed by Sam Newfield
Films set in London
Hammer Film Productions films
Lippert Pictures films
1950s British films